Yutthana Kaensa (born 7 January 1998), known as Stamp Kiatniwat (แสตมป์ เกียรตินิวัฒน์), Stamp Sithmorseng (แสตมป์ ศิษย์หมอเส็ง), or Stamp  Kratingdaenggym (แสตมป์ กระทิงแดงยิม), is a professional boxer from Thailand in the flyweight division. He was considered the youngest Thai world champion at the age of 17 (although he is an interim champion). He is a former WBA Asia Flyweight champion.

Biography and career
Yutthana Kaensa, nicknamed Stamp, was born in Lao Suea Kok District), Mueang Ubon Ratchathani District, Ubon Ratchathani province, and is a cousin of Poonsawat Kratingdaenggym, a former WBA Super bantamweight world champion.

He won the WPBF Light flyweight title by wins over fellow-countryman Kwanthai Sithmorseng, a former WBA Minimumweight world champion on August 8, 2014, at Sanam Luang, Phra Nakhon District, Bangkok, and on September 23 of the same year he won the WBA Asia Flyweight title by wins over Samuel Tehuayo, an Indonesian boxer at Ayutthaya City Park, Ayutthaya province. He defended his title twice.

On July 29, 2015, he won the WBA Flyweight interim title by wins over Gregorio Lebron, a Dominican contender at Loei province and he defended it once with the old rival Gregorio Lebron at Bangkokthonburi University, Thawi Watthana District, Bangkok, on February 9, 2016.

On December 31, 2016, he challenged WBA Flyweight world title Kazuto Ioka, a Japanese holder in the elimination fight at Shimazu Arena, Kyoto, Japan. He lost by TKO in the seventh round.

He usually trains at the boxing gym inside Bangkokthonburi University with Anant Tualue, who was a trainer of Chana Porpaoin, a former two-time WBA Minimumweight world champion, and Denkaosan Kaovichit, a former WBA Flyweight world champion and former WBA Super flyweight interim champion be a trainer.

On May 18, 2018, Kiatniwat defeated TKO with left punches just the second round for the Filipino contender Jaysever Abcede at Bangkokthonburi University to lose WBA Asia Flyweight title. After the bout his manager Niwat "Che-Mae" Laosuwanwat said he would stop cheering him on to become a champion. Due to the fact that his body is too fragile.

Professional boxing record

References

External links
 

1998 births
Living people
Stamp Kiatniwat
Light-flyweight boxers
Mini-flyweight boxers
Flyweight boxers
Stamp Kiatniwat